Cornelia (minor planet designation: 425 Cornelia) is a large Main belt asteroid. It was discovered by Auguste Charlois on 28 December 1896 in Nice. It is named after Cornelia Africana.

References

External links
 
 

Background asteroids
Cornelia
Cornelia
C-type asteroids (SMASS)
18961228